We Who Are About to Die is a 1937 film directed by Christy Cabanne and starring Preston Foster, Ann Dvorak, and John Beal. It was based on a book by David Lansom, who was tried four times for murdering his wife before being set free.

Premise
A man is kidnapped by mobsters after quitting his job, then wrongly arrested, tried, and sentenced to death for murders they committed.  A suspicious detective thinks he is innocent and works to save his life.

Production
Lansom was hired by producer Edward Small to work on the script.

References

External links

1937 films
American black-and-white films
Films based on non-fiction books
1937 crime drama films
American crime drama films
RKO Pictures films
Films about capital punishment
American prison drama films
Films produced by Edward Small
1930s English-language films
1930s American films